The 2014 Slovenian Supercup, known as Superpokal Telekom Slovenije 2014 due to sponsorship reasons, was the tenth edition of the Slovenian Supercup, an annual football match contested by the winners of the previous season's Slovenian PrvaLiga and Slovenian Cup competitions. The match was played on 13 August 2014 at the Nova Gorica Sports Park stadium in Nova Gorica between the 2013–14 Slovenian Cup winners Gorica and the 2013–14 Slovenian PrvaLiga winners Maribor.

Match details

See also
2013–14 Slovenian PrvaLiga
2013–14 Slovenian Cup
2014–15 NK Maribor season

External links
Slovenian Supercup

Slovenian Supercup
Supercup
Slovenian Supercup 2014